Carolina Coto Segnini is a Costa Rican model and actress. She has appeared on the cover of magazines such as Health & Fitness Magazine, Runners World, Revista Ejercicio y Salud and  SoHo. In addition, she appeared in campaigns of Clairol, Nike and Adidas. She represented her country as Miss Global Beauty Queen 2009, held in China.

Early life 
She was born in San Jose, Costa Rica. She is the daughter of the Costa Rican journalist Giannina Segnini, who is of Italian/Lebanese. Her father is Spanish/Costa Rican. She is an alumna of the Latin University of Costa Rica and London School of Economics and Political Science. Carolina practiced Olympic gymnastics and competitive cheerleading throughout her childhood. She began her modeling career at the age of twelve.

She was part of the athletics and taekwondo team during her school days while living in Cambridge. She has been practicing boxing for 12 years.

Career 
In 2006, Carolina Coto was selected in the top 7 for Miss Reef International. She represented Costa Rica in the international beauty pageant Miss Global Beauty Queen 2009, held in China where she also bagged the Miss Bikini award. She was in the top 10 contestants for Miss World Costa Rica in 2009. She joined Elite Model Management in 2009.

Carolina Coto has worked for designers such as Nicolita, Emilia Wickstead, Luli Fama and Nicole Miller. She debuted in the Mercedes-Benz Fashion Week for Swim in July 2010. She walked for designers such as Dorit Swimwear at Mercedes-Benz Fashion Week in 2011 and 2012.

She has worked for clients like Avon Products, Hermès, Woods, 2XU and Mango (clothing) and appeared in ad-campaigns of Clairol, Nike, and Adidas.

Carolina made the cover of the last SoHo (magazine) in Costa Rica in 2013 in celebration of the environment, as the "green issue", she appeared in a previous cover in the year 2009. In London UK, Carolina did the campaign for Stella Artois and Water.org. She has also appeared in Self (magazine) and Women's Runners. In June 2014, she appeared in the cover of Runners World Brazil. In December 2014, she campaigned for Nike, Inc. and Adidas in Europe, which was seen in England, Switzerland, Spain, France, Italy, and Germany. Carolina has been featured in the cover of Health & Fitness Magazine in England on five occasions in the year 2015 and 2016.

She also starred the role of a boxer in 2017, the I Am advertising video of the brand of martial arts sportswear, Kimurawear. That production has won several awards as best commercial, among the recognitions include: Los Angeles Independent Film Festival, Paris Play Film Festival, Hollywood International Moving Pictures Film Festival, Oniros Film Awards, among others.

She is a Brand Ambassador for Vibrant Health. Carolina Coto appeared in TV commercials for Zudy Software with Super Bowl star Julian Edelman and Simon's Army in The X Factor.

In June 2018, she played the lead role of a young mom in the music video No es Justo of J Balvin, directed by Daniel Duran.

Coto has worked with agencies like CGM Models - Miami, Wilhelmina Models - Chicago, Model Club - Boston, Heffner Model Management - Seattle, W Model Management - London, - Mexico, and State Model Management - New York City.

Pageants

Music videos

Commercials

Other work
She was selected by the Internet Society as candidate to attend to LACIGF (Latin America and Caribbean Internet Governance Forum) in Bogota, Colombia. She also served as VP of Internet Society - New York Chapter (ISOC-NY).
 
Coto is co-founder of a company called Ecomercado, which provides organic products in Costa Rica.

References

External links

 
 
 Carolina Coto's Interview
 Carolina Coto on Heffner Management
 5 Moves For Your Strongest Core at Refinery29

Living people
Costa Rican female models
People from San José, Costa Rica
Actresses from San José, Costa Rica
21st-century Spanish actresses
Year of birth missing (living people)
Latin University of Costa Rica alumni